Two Brides and a Baby is a 2011 Nigerian romantic drama film directed by Teco Benson and starring Keira Hewatch, Kalu Ikeagwu, OC Ukeje, Chelsea Eze, Stella Damasus-Aboderin and Okey Uzoeshi. It premiered on 17 November 2011. It received awards and nominations at Africa Movie Academy Awards, Best of Nollywood Awards and Africa Magic Viewers Choice Awards.

Plot

Keche (Keira Hewatch) and Bankole (OC Ukeje) believe that their relationship has been divinely planned. They plan on having an amazing wedding ceremony and believe their marriage will stand the test of time. An unexpected event gets uncovered that tests how much they are really willing to sacrifice for their union to workout.

Cast
 OC Ukeje as Kole Badmus
 Keira Hewatch as Keche
 Stella Damasus-Aboderin as Ama
 Kalu Ikeagwu as Deji
 Okey Uzoeshi as Maye
 Chelsea Eze as Ugo
 Kehinde Bankole as Pewa

Reception
The film has a 43% rating on Nollywood Reinvented with a conclusion that "...it’s quite the placid movie, it’s not emotionally moving in any way. However, if you look at it at some kind of foundation of what we hope for in Nollywood productions then it makes the movie that much more appealing." YNaija praised the film and concluded that "the film [is] more admired than loved. It shows that with the right hands, Nollywood can make a decent movie, and this is a decent film indeed." It however singled out the yoruba performance of Deji (Kalu Ikeagwu) as the only negative in the film. Amarachukwu Iwuala of Entertainment Express was very critical of the directing and felt that attention was not properly given to many important details of the film. Dami Elebe of Connect Nigeria praised the plot, acting and production but felt that the editing and directing should have been better.

See also
 List of Nigerian films of 2011

References

External links
 Two Brides and a Baby at Nollywood Reinvented
 Two Brides and a Baby at Rotten Tomatoes

Nigerian romantic drama films
2011 romantic drama films
2011 films
Nigerian nonlinear narrative films
2010s English-language films
English-language Nigerian films
Films shot in Nigeria
Africa Magic Viewers' Choice Awards winners